Miskolczi is a Hungarian surname.

Notable people with this surname include:
 Julianna Miskolczi (born 1983), Hungarian sports shooter
 Katalin Miskolczi (born 1976), Hungarian tennis player
 László Miskolczi (born 1986), Hungarian football player

Surnames of Hungarian origin